Vat 69 is a blended Scotch whisky produced by Diageo in Scotland. It was created by William Sanderson & Son Limited of South Queensferry, Scotland.

History
William Sanderson was  born in Leith, Scotland January 27, 1839. He started an apprenticeship with wine and spirituous liquors producer Matthew Buchan at the age of 13. By 1863, he already owned his own business producing liqueurs and whisky blends. In 1880, his son William Mark joined the business and persuaded his father to bottle various blends of whisky.

The famous Vat 69 bottle with its bulbous neck was introduced to the market and was not changed for the next hundred years. In 1882, William Sanderson prepared one hundred casks of blended whisky and hired a panel of experts to taste them. The batch from the cask (or “vat”) with number 69 was judged to be the best, and this provided the whisky's brand name. The whisky was at first bottled in port bottles. In 1884, Sanderson bought the Glen Garioch distillery which was situated in the middle of a barley field. The distillery was meant to ensure the delivery of grain whisky.

Sanderson took care that there were always new products to be blended, because DCL, which was a strong society at that time, controlled such a large amount of the production that it had a huge influence on the supply of the competing company. For this reason Sanderson, together with Usher and Bell, founded a company to produce grain whisky, which still exists today as the North British Distillery. Sanderson sourced a few malt whiskies used to blend Vat 69 from a friend, John Begg, who owned the Royal Lochnagar distillery. When Begg died, Sanderson became director of Begg's distillery. In 1933, Sanderson's company merged with Booth's Distilleries, which merged again with the DCL group in 1935.

In autumn 1980, "Vat 69 Reserve" from the House of Sanderson had its world première in England.

Blend

Despite its name, it is not a vatted malt, but a blend of about 40 malt and grain whiskies. Vat 69 Reserve carries no standard age statement.

Since autumn 1980, Glenesk, which is a 12-year-old Highland Single Malt (40%), is available from Sanderson in Germany. Glenesk is stored for at least 12 years in sherry barrels. Since 1964, William Sanderson & Sons Ltd. has produced "Antiquary", which is a 12-year-old De-Luxe-Scotch-Whisky (40%).

Products
Whisky products available from Sanderson in Germany are:
 VAT 69 Finest Scotch Whisky (40%)
 VAT 69 Reserve de Luxe Scotch Whisky (40%)
 Glenesk Single Malt Highland Scotch 12 Years Old (40%)
 The Antiquary de Luxe Old Scotch Whisky 12 Years Old (40%).

Whisky products available from Sanderson in Australia are:
 700 mL Vat 69 Fine Scotch Whisky (40%)

Media appearances

Enjoyed by General Frank Savage (played by Gregory Peck) in Twelve O'Clock High, a 1949 WWII movie about the US Air Force in England 1943.

Vat 69 was the beverage of choice in the Preston household (Bette Davis and Gary Merrill) and also the mode of delivery for the titular poison in Another Man's Poison (1951).

Vat 69 was the spotlight whiskey for the bad guys in Bollywood movies throughout the 60s, 70s, and 80s.

Captain Lewis Nixon, an American World War II army officer who is a major figure in the 1992 non-fiction book Band of Brothers by Stephen E. Ambrose and the award-winning 2001 HBO miniseries made from it, is portrayed as an enthusiastic drinker who went to great lengths to obtain supplies of Vat 69.

Dan Turner, Hollywood Detective, a fictional character created by pulp magazine, radio, and TV writer Robert Leslie Bellem, kept a ready supply of Vat 69 in his apartment, and had remarkably good luck finding a handy bottle at most of the murder scenes he investigated.

In The Adventures of Buckaroo Banzai Across the 8th Dimension, Ellen Barkin character Penny Priddy says "I guess I just soaked up a bit too much Vat 69 here." while clutching the bottle and crying at a cocktail table.

In a Dirty Harry scene where crooks are held up in a store and "request" a car, Harry decides to give them one. Upon exiting the car once inside, on a wall can be seen, "VAT 69 Gold" appearing on a yellow sign in a stencil font.

Towards the end of the final episode of The Field of Blood (TV series), three journalists are seen sharing a bottle of Vat 69 in their newspaper office.

References

Blended Scotch whisky
Scottish brands
Diageo brands
British Royal Warrant holders